Butchered at Birth is the second studio album by American death metal band Cannibal Corpse. It was released on July 1, 1991 through Metal Blade Records.

With their sophomore album, Cannibal Corpse sought to create a heavier sound and even more gruesome imagery than their debut. The album cover was created by longtime collaborator Vince Locke and is frequently identified as one of the most gruesome album covers of all time. Vocalist Chris Barnes handled all of the lyrics for the album and strove to create the first death metal concept album, with the stated concept being "butchery." 

Still based in Buffalo, New York at the time, the band rehearsed and wrote the album in a practice space converted from a hospital for the incurably ill. Following their experience recording Eaten Back to Life at Morrisound Recording in Tampa, the band made frequent trips and became entrenched in the booming death metal scene there. The spirit of competition within the scene encouraged them to keep a quick pace with releases and to develop the heaviest sound possible. Producer Scott Burns was revered within the scene and helped the band to further refine the sound they had created on their debut to be even more dissonant and guttural.

Track listing
All lyrics written by Chris Barnes. All music written by Cannibal Corpse.

Personnel
Cannibal Corpse
 Chris Barnes – vocals
 Bob Rusay – lead guitar
 Jack Owen – rhythm guitar
 Alex Webster – bass
 Paul Mazurkiewicz – drums
 Pat O'Brien – lead guitar on live bonus track
 George "Corpsegrinder" Fisher – vocals on live bonus track
Additional musicians
 Glen Benton – backing vocals on "Vomit the Soul"

References

1991 albums
Cannibal Corpse albums
Metal Blade Records albums
Albums produced by Scott Burns (record producer)
Albums recorded at Morrisound Recording
Obscenity controversies in music